Platycerus cribripennis is a species of stag beetle, from the Lucinidae family and Lucaninae subfamily. It was discovered by Van Dyke in 1928.

Geographical distribution 
It can be found in North America.

References 

Lucaninae
Beetles described in 1928